Lunara Syzdykova (born 20 January 2000) is a Kazakhstani handball player for USC Dostyk and the Kazakhstani national team.

She represented Kazakhstan at the 2019 World Women's Handball Championship.

References

2000 births
Living people
Kazakhstani female handball players
21st-century Kazakhstani women